Grafton Public Library may refer to:

Grafton Public Library (Grafton, Massachusetts)
Grafton Public Library (Grafton, North Dakota), a Carnegie library in North Dakota
Grafton Public Library (Grafton, Vermont), listed on the National Register of Historic Places